Salehuddin "Sal" Ayob (born 22 November 1964) is a Malaysian slalom canoer who competed in the mid-to-late 1990s. He finished 43rd in the K-1 event at the 1996 Summer Olympics in Atlanta.

His daughter, Aruwin Salehhuddin has qualified to represent Malaysia in alpine skiing at the 2022 Winter Olympics in Beijing.

References

 Sports-Reference.com profile

1964 births
Canoeists at the 1996 Summer Olympics
Living people
Malaysian male canoeists
Olympic canoeists of Malaysia